Tobias Bauschke (born 1987) is a German politician for the FDP and since 2021 member of the Abgeordnetenhaus of Berlin, the state parliament of Berlin.

Politics 

Bauschke was born 1987 in the Bavarian town of Deggendorf and became a member of the Abgeordnetenhaus in 2021.

References 

Living people
1987 births
21st-century German politicians
Members of the Abgeordnetenhaus of Berlin
People from Deggendorf
Free Democratic Party (Germany) politicians
Date of birth missing (living people)